KLSR-TV (channel 34) is a television station in Eugene, Oregon, United States, affiliated with the Fox network. It is owned by Cox Media Group alongside low-power, Class A MyNetworkTV affiliate KEVU-CD (channel 23). Both stations share studios on Chad Drive in Eugene, while KLSR's transmitter is located on South Ridge.

History

KLSR signed on the air on Halloween in 1991 as KEVU, and was Eugene's second UHF station to sign on the air. Prior to that, Fox programming was seen on Class A station K25AS (now sister station KEVU-CD). KEVU changed its call letters to KLSR-TV on April 1, 1997.

On February 24, 2022, it was announced that California Oregon Broadcasting, Inc. would sell KLSR-TV and KEVU-CD to Atlanta-based Cox Media Group for $7,222,000; the sale was completed on May 3.

Newscasts
KVAL-TV produces live 7 p.m. and 10 p.m. newscasts for KLSR entitled Oregon's News @ 7 and Oregon's News @ 10, on weekdays and KVAL News @10 on Fox, a repeat of the evening news on weekends. In September 2010, KVAL started producing a live morning newscast for KLSR called Fox News Mornings, which was later dropped and replaced by a replay of KVAL's 6 a.m. hour of morning news.

KVAL's newscasts on KLSR started broadcasting in 16:9 widescreen in late September 2010, and were upgraded to HD (along with KVAL's other newscasts) in February 2020.

Technical information

Subchannels
The station's digital signal is multiplexed:

In August 2019, then-owner California Oregon Broadcasting, Inc. upgraded the full-market simulcast of KEVU-CD over KLSR-DT2 to the 720p HD picture format; prior to this upgrade, the subchannel was being presented in 480i 4:3 SD. This is concurrent with the upgrade of KEVU-CD to the 1080i full HD picture format.

Analog-to-digital conversion
KLSR-TV shut down its analog signal, over UHF channel 34, at 12:01 a.m. on February 17, 2009, the original target date on which full-power television stations in the United States were to transition from analog to digital broadcasts under federal mandate (which was later pushed back to June 12, 2009). The station's digital signal remained on its pre-transition UHF channel 31. Through the use of PSIP, digital television receivers display the station's virtual channel as its former UHF analog channel 34.

Translators

Controversy
In November 2012, the Federal Communications Commission (FCC) fined KLSR $13,000 for not filing paperwork for children's E/I programming for its Eugene translator, K19GH-D, in the previous four years. While the station has since caught up on its paperwork, the FCC has said that it is no excuse for not doing it in the first place.

See also
KEVU-CD

References

External links

Bill Smullin: Southern Oregon TV's pioneer

Fox network affiliates
Television channels and stations established in 1991
LSR-TV
1991 establishments in Oregon
Cox Media Group